San Pedro de Urabá is a municipality in Antioquia Department, Colombia.

Climate
San Pedro de Urabá has a tropical monsoon climate (Am) with moderate to little rainfall from December to March and heavy rainfall in the remaining months.

References

Municipalities of Antioquia Department